The St. Padre Pio Shrine is an outdoor Roman Catholic shrine in the Landisville section of Buena, New Jersey dedicated to the 20th-century Italian saint Padre Pio and completed in 2002.

Description
The shrine was conceived in 1997 by Marie and Pete D'Andrea, Italian-American farmers in Buena, and was designed by local architect Ron Angelo. The structure was completed in 2002, and consists of a four-storey monument and three statues on ten acres of land.  The monument is composed of a steel frame covered with white stucco, and inside the monument are the statues of Padre Pio, the Blessed Mother, and the Sacred Heart of Jesus. The shrine has a glove of Saint Padre Pio as a relic. Rosary prayer sessions are held at the shrine on Wednesday evenings (7:00 PM), and some individuals have claimed to have experienced miracles resulting from praying at the shrine. In 2009, the shrine suffered damage during a robbery attempt of the shrine's donation box.

References

Buildings and structures in Atlantic County, New Jersey
Roman Catholic Diocese of Camden
Roman Catholic shrines
Buena, New Jersey